Major Hercules Langford Taylour (9 September 1759 – 20 May 1790) styled The Honourable from 1760, was an Irish soldier and politician.

He was the second son of Thomas Taylour, 1st Earl of Bective and his wife Jane Rowley, daughter of Hercules Langford Rowley and Elizabeth Rowley, 1st Viscountess Langford. His older brother was Thomas Taylour, 1st Marquess of Headfort and his younger brothers were Robert Taylour and Clotworthy Rowley, 1st Baron Langford.

Taylour served in British Army and was major of the 5th Dragoon Guards (Princess Charlotte of Wales's). In 1781, he entered the Irish House of Commons for Kells, the same constituency his father had represented, and was Member of Parliament (MP) until his death in 1790. He never married nor sired any children.

References

1759 births
1790 deaths
5th Dragoon Guards officers
Irish MPs 1776–1783
Irish MPs 1783–1790
Members of the Parliament of Ireland (pre-1801) for County Meath constituencies
Younger sons of earls
Hercules